Jeffrey DeLaurentis (born 1954) is an American diplomat who served as the Chargé d'affaires ad interim of the Embassy of the United States, Havana from 2015 to 2017 and is currently serving as the acting U.S. ambassador for special political affairs. 

DeLaurentis has ambassadorial rank in the State Department because his prior position at the UN was a US Senate-confirmed ambassadorial position. Cuba and the United States formally restored diplomatic relations on July 20, 2015, after having severed diplomatic ties in 1961 amid the Cold War.

Early life and education
DeLaurentis is a graduate of the Edmund A. Walsh School of Foreign Service at Georgetown University and the School of International and Public Affairs at Columbia University. He also studied toward a doctorate in political science at Columbia's Graduate School of Arts and Sciences.

Career
DeLaurentis began his diplomatic career as a consular officer in 1991, posted to Havana, Cuba. Later he returned to Cuba in 1999 serving as the political-economic section chief until 2002. He also served as Political Counselor at the U.S. Mission to the United Nations in Geneva, and Political Counselor at the U.S. Embassy in Bogota. Stateside, DeLaurentis served as executive assistant to the Under Secretary of State for Democracy and Global Affairs, Special Assistant to the Assistant Secretary of State for Western Hemisphere Affairs, and Director of Inter-American Affairs at the National Security Council. His last diplomatic assignment was at the Harvard Kennedy School as a senior diplomatic fellow with the Belfer Center Future of Diplomacy Project.

Barack Obama officially nominated DeLaurentis as United States Ambassador to Cuba on September 27, 2016.

DeLaurentis finished his 3-year cycle on July 7, 2017, and was replaced by Scott Hamilton.

See also
United States–Cuban Thaw

References

External links

Embassy of the United States - Havana, Cuba - Chargé d'Affaires: Biography

|-

|-

1954 births
Living people
Walsh School of Foreign Service alumni
School of International and Public Affairs, Columbia University alumni
Ambassadors of the United States to Cuba